1156 Kira, provisional designation , is a stony background asteroid from the inner regions of the asteroid belt, approximately 9 kilometers in diameter. It was discovered on 22 February 1928, by German astronomer Karl Reinmuth at Heidelberg Observatory in southwest Germany. Any reference of its name to a person or occurrence is unknown.

Orbit and classification 

Kira is not a member of any known asteroid family and belongs to the main belt's background population. At the present epoch, however, it orbits within the region of the Flora family.

This asteroid orbits the Sun in the inner main-belt at a distance of 2.1–2.3 AU once every 3 years and 4 months (1,222 days). Its orbit has an eccentricity of 0.05 and an inclination of 1° with respect to the ecliptic. The body's observation arc begins with its official discovery observation at Heidelberg.

Physical characteristics 

Kira is an assumed stony S-type asteroid.

Rotation period 

Several rotational lightcurves of Kira have been obtained from photometric observations since 2007. Lightcurve analysis gave a rotation period between 2.7910 and 2.79113 hours with a brightness variation of 0.20 to 0.26 magnitude.

Diameter and albedo 

According to the surveys carried out by the Japanese Akari satellite and the NEOWISE mission of NASA's Wide-field Infrared Survey Explorer, Kira measures between 6.83 and 10.83 kilometers in diameter  and its surface has an albedo between 0.165 and 0.455.

The Collaborative Asteroid Lightcurve Link assumes a standard albedo for stony asteroids of 0.20 and calculates a diameter of 10.30 kilometers based on an absolute magnitude of 12.3.

Naming 

This minor planet was named by astronomer Max Mündler, staff member at Heidelberg Observatory. Any reference of its name to a person or occurrence is unknown.

Unknown meaning 

Among the many thousands of named minor planets, Kira is one of 120 asteroids, for which no official naming citation has been published.

Notes

References

External links 
 Asteroid Lightcurve Database (LCDB), query form (info )
 Dictionary of Minor Planet Names, Google books
 Asteroids and comets rotation curves, CdR – Observatoire de Genève, Raoul Behrend
 Discovery Circumstances: Numbered Minor Planets (1)-(5000) – Minor Planet Center
 
 

001156
Discoveries by Karl Wilhelm Reinmuth
Named minor planets
19280222